Marshall Dawson Miller (January 2, 1919 – September 9, 2008), also known as Mark Miller, was a New York winemaker and magazine illustrator.  Miller was known for being the proprietor of Benmarl Vineyards in the Hudson Valley of Marlboro, N.Y. and being a highly visible public advocate for small wineries.  His artwork is famous for romance and was featured in The Saturday Evening Post.  His memoirs, Wine – A Gentleman's Game: The Adventures of an Amateur Winemaker Turned Professional, were published in 1984.

Early life and education 
Miller was born in Eldorado, Oklahoma, where his family owned cotton farms.  He studied art in college; first at the University of Oklahoma, and then at the Chouinard Art Institute via transfer.

References

External links

American winemakers
1919 births
2008 deaths
People from New York (state)